Childlore is the folklore or folk culture of children and young people. It includes, for example, rhymes and games played in the school playground. The best known researchers of the field were Iona and Peter Opie.

Overview 
The subject matter of childlore includes the traditions of children between the ages of about 6 and 15 such as games, riddles, rhymes, jokes, pranks, superstitions, magical practices, wit, lyrics, guile, epithets, nicknames, torments, parody, oral legislation, seasonal customs, tortures, obscenities, codes, etc. as well as individual activities such as solitary play, daydreaming, fantasies, imaginary friends and heroes, collections, scrapbooks, model worlds, comic reading, mass media interests, dramatizations, stories, art, etc.

As a branch of folklore, childlore is concerned with those activities which are learned and passed on by children to other children. The stories and games taught by adults to children are not considered childlore except insofar as the children adapt and make them their own. In western culture most folklorists are concerned with children after they join their peers in elementary school or kindergarten. The traditions of childhood generally stop after the child enters intermediate school, which coincides with puberty and adolescence.

Iona and Peter Opie demonstrated that the culture of children is quite distinctive, often going unnoticed by the adult world around it.

Opie stated that the words of one game (Buck buck) had survived from the time of Nero. 

It has been argued that the conservatism of childlore contrasts with the way adult folklore is rapidly modified to fit changing circumstances.

Nursery rhymes 

A nursery rhyme is a traditional poem or song that's told or sung to young children. The term dates back to the late-18th and early-19th centuries in Britain where most of the earliest nursery rhymes that are known today were recorded in English but eventually spread to other countries. The tradition of children's nursery rhymes is largely considered a form of verbal lore, both written and oral, with traditional utterances of repetitive patterns that vary in style and tone.

History of nursery rhymes 

The term "Mother Goose rhymes", which is interchangeable with nursery rhymes, originates from the early 1600s in relation to a collection of stories in a monthly periodical from a French critic, Jean Loret's "La Muse Historique". This contains the earliest reference to Mother Goose in the line "Comme un conte de la Mere Oye" translated into "Like a Mother Goose story". However, these stories weren't referring to any of the best-known Mother Goose rhymes that are most associated with the term, which instead have English origins.

Thomas Carnan, stepson of publisher John Newbery's, became the owner of Newsberry Publishing House following the death of John Newberry and was the first to use the term Mother Goose for children's nursery rhymes when he published "Mother Goose's Melody" and "Sonnets for the Cradle". This was the first known publication of the collection of Mother Goose rhymes in 1780, describing a compilation of traditional English nonsense nursery rhymes and songs each with its own black and white illustration and came from a variety of sources The term 'Mother Goose' has been linked with traditional children's nursery rhymes and songs in the English speaking world ever since.

Nursery rhymes in context 

For generations, many young children have grown up learning and passing on these Mother Goose rhymes as a part of oral tradition, perpetuating the culture of childhood. The anthropological approach to this field of childlore emphasizes that the songs and rhymes that children teach one another and pass forward through generations are unique to children, differing from the nursery rhymes taught by adults. The works of Peter and Iona Opie brought significant contributions to this field of childlore, particularly in examining the traditions of children's nursery rhymes.

In the early 1950s, "The Lore and Language of Schoolchildren" offered considerable insight as the first known publication of ethnographic research in which children themselves were consulted about their beliefs and oral traditions, including songs and rhymes. Opie and Opie demonstrate that there are two classes of nursery rhymes that children inherit: those which are essential to the regulation of their games and their relationships with each other; and then those which are "mere expressions of exuberance" and are repeated for no more reason than they heard it from someone else. The latter of the two classes speaks to observations where Opie and Opie discerned how traditional rhymes seemingly appeal to children as something funny and remarkable in itself, often fascinated by the way it all rhymes with repetitive patterns and various styles and tones. For example, a popular English rhyme Opie and Opie heard from children as they tumble out of school:

This particular rhyme had little relevancy or meaning to adults but for children, Opie and Opie observed that these rhymes fascinated the children with its amusing tones and repetitive patterns. Additionally, Opie and Opie observed that the children also used these nursery rhymes as a means of communication with each other during a time where language is still fairly new to them and there are many occurrences in children experiencing difficulties expressing themselves. Simply, children often burst into telling and singing these rhymes as a cover in unexpected situations, to fill awkward silences, to hide an unexpressed emotion, or even in a gasp of excitement. As a result, these practices are very useful for children in their daily lives where they're easily adapting to using songs and rhymes in their social encounters, for amusement and for practical reasons.

Impact of nursery rhymes

Communication and language development 
One of the earliest ways children learn to communicate is through nursery rhymes. Earlier on, hearing nursery rhymes is how children begin to imitate sounds and learn to speak with a broad English vocabulary. Both the parents and child can speak and sing nursery rhymes together and the child will start to imitate the sounds and pronounce those words after talking about the nursery rhymes they heard. Eventually, the child begins to add additional words to their vocabulary, which opens up more opportunities of words to use when wanting to talk or sing. An example of this is seen in the saying "Sally go round the Sun".

When speaking this nursery rhyme to the child, the parents have the option to change the word around to the word over, under or through, expanding the vocabulary of the child and improving their language skills. Likewise, children eventually begin to learn to communicate using various styles of language, such as alliteration and onomatopoeia through nursery rhymes, which provides children with a framework for these various styles of language as they mature in their language skills.

Additionally, nursery rhymes expand the mental ability of children, exposing them to new ideas and encouraging them to use their imagination through the use of repetition. The simple, easily repeatable and satisfying rhythmic pattern makes nursery rhymes extremely appealing to children, which is significant as repetition is essential in language development. Simply, in order for a nursery rhyme to be effective, it must be repeated to the child multiple times. This repetition allows the child to increase their phonetic awareness and promotes spelling skills.

Furthermore, the anthropological works of Morag Maclean, Peter Bryant, and Lynette Bradley provides further insight examining the impact of nursery rhymes on communication and language development. In 1987, an in-depth study was conducted in which the researchers found that the study demonstrated that children begin their phonetic awareness before learning to read through activities of which have no reading involved, such that there is a strong relationship between knowledge of nursery rhymes and phonetic development.  Simply, the ability to break down words into sounds and syllables is necessary for children to fully understand and use the alphabet and children develop these early literacy skills by learning nursery rhymes. For example, this was observed in the nursery rhyme "A Sailor Went to the Sea":

The exposure to this nursery rhyme allowed children to learn homophones and how there are different meanings for the words sea and see, even though they are pronounced the same, which essentially allows children to enhance and improve their language skills. All in all, practicing nursery rhymes effectively allows most children to receive great cognitive benefits.

Social and emotional development 
The nature of nursery rhymes serve as a tool for building and improving social and emotional skills for young children. Fundamentally, traditional children's nursery rhymes are a method of storytelling with beneficial aspects, such as voice inflection and engagement with the listener that allows children to develop a social and emotional understanding from the nursery rhymes.[13]

Additionally, many children may learn to make friends and build relationships with other children through nursery rhymes. Often, nursery rhymes involve cooperation and/or physical activity with the listener, which can be conducted in larger group settings. As a result, children have the opportunity to work with one another through guided instructions, which facilitate effective and engaged interactions contributing directly to their social development.

For example, the nursery rhyme "Ring Around the Rosie" involves children dancing around in a circle as they recite a short and catchy rhyme:

Simply, participating in these interactions in connections between movement and rhymes can allow children to engage with others, promoting social skills. Also, generally, nursery rhymes tend to involve repeated interactions between characters of all ages, genders, shapes and sizes. In this way, a child gradually develops an acceptance and respect for all people regardless of a person's background or cultural differences.

Likewise, traditional children's nursery rhymes have a similar beneficial impact on emotional development. Primarily, nursery rhymes serve as an effective practice providing nourishment and comfort inducing a calming effect on children, especially right before sleep.

Simply, hearing nursery rhymes before falling asleep reminds children that they are in a familiar environment, which facilitates feelings of safety and a peace of mind. With that in mind, this provides a possible explanation for why non-parental caretakers often rely on nursery rhymes to alleviate the child's discomfort and uncertainty whenever their parents are absent. As a result, nursery rhymes serve as an effective tool for emotional development in building trust in uncomfortable situations.

Moreover, some traditional children's nursery rhymes may involve some sorts of conflict, which the characters within the nursery rhyme must find a resolution. At times, this may involve reconciling certain unwanted emotions of jealousy, anger, or sadness stemming from a multitude of causes. Consequently, this enables an teachable understanding of adversity and assisting in building strong emotional management skills in children.

A primary example of this lies within the vastly popular "Itsy Bitsy Spider" through the refrain:

In this instance, the spider is washed down from the top of the water spout for reasons outside of its control; however, the spider endures the rain and once again reaches the top of the spout. Although simple in concept, these traditional children's nursery rhymes instill the value of perseverance in spite of unavoidable obstacles and essentially improve the social and emotional development of children.

Cross-cultural observations 
Nearly every culture throughout the world has their own various forms of nursery rhymes. Although the theme of each rhyme varies across cultures, all of these distinct traditional children's nursery rhymes are designed to convey similar types of messages and tend to take the same shape with respect to meter, rhythm and rhyme. While there are a few stylistic differences for certain cultures as compared to others, these tend to be minor.

To elaborate, the anthropological approach provides insight into one of the major similarities that can be seen in nursery rhymes across cultures, which is the meter used. The goal of most nursery rhymes is to be told or sung to young children as a form of entertainment or as a means of learning certain lessons. To accomplish this goal, traditional children's nursery rhymes must take a simple form that can easily be learned and repeated by children. As a result, nursery rhymes typically take the shape of a repetitive and predictable pattern of stressed and unstressed syllables, known as isochronic meter. This meter does not necessarily have to take the form of repeating stressed and unstressed syllables one at a time, but will often leave as many as four unstressed syllables between each stressed syllable.  The simplicity of isochronic meter allows for this slight variability in the stressed syllable pattern such that each poem does not have to take the exact same form and can still be easily read in a very similar manner across various cultures. An example of this pattern of stressed and unstressed syllables can be seen clearly in the style of poems in several languages including English, Chinese, Bengkulu, and Yoruba in Nigeria.

Furthermore, another significant aspect of nursery rhymes that tends to be fairly standard across cultures is the number of lines that occur in a poem. Typically, these poems contain four lines with four beats in each line. These beats, as mentioned above, occur in an isochronic pattern. The anthropological approach to traditional nursery rhymes has revealed that in English poetry, it is highly uncommon to find a nursery rhyme that deviates from this pattern. But, in other cultures, these conventions may be different. For example, in Chinese nursery rhymes, there seems to be less rigidity in the requirement that poems have four beats per line only. There are multiple examples of nursery rhymes that contain a longer first line—with six beats—followed by three more conventional lines containing four beats each. Additionally, in Chinese nursery rhymes, certain poems have been seen to have up to 6 four-beat lines as opposed to the more traditional four lines.

Lastly, an additional convention that seems to be fairly universal in children's nursery rhymes is the pattern of rests before or after the lines. In English poetry, a rest is found most commonly after the second and fourth lines of a poem, or after each line in a poem, while sometimes there will be rests after lines one, two, and four. Any deviations from these three schemes will tend to create awkwardness in the reading. Similar patterns are found within other cultures. For example, rhymes in Bengkulu often require rests at the beginning of each verse, which is very similar to the pattern found in English with slight variation, while rests in Chinese tend to be like those in English, with rests after each line.

Further cross-cultural similarities in nursery rhymes are aspects such as rhyme scheme, which tend to be found in an abab pattern, with slight variations, although rhyme scheme variation is less common as it adds complexity to the reading and understanding of these rhymes which are inherently designed to be much simpler. All in all, nursery rhymes are at the foundation of culture and provide great insight into the common, socially learned knowledge and behavioral patterns across the world.

See also 
 Children's street culture
 Latin American childlore
 Cooties
 Dong, Dong, Dongdaemun

Notes

References 
 Grider, Sylvia Ann. The Study of Children's Folklore. Western Folklore 39.3, Children's Folklore (1980): 159–69.
 Mendoza, Vicente T. Lirica Infantil De Mexico. Letras Mexicanas. 2a ed. Mexico: Fondo de Cultura Economica, 1980
 Opie, Iona Archibald, and Peter Opie. The Lore and Language of Schoolchildren. Trans. Peter Opie. Oxford Paperbacks. New York: Oxford University Press, 1987.
 Sutton-Smith, Brian. Psychology of Childlore: The Triviality Barrier. Western Folklore 29.1 (1970): 1–8.
 Burling, Robbins. "The Metrics of Children's Verse: A Cross-Linguistic Study". The Metrics of Children's Verse: A Cross‐Linguistic Study1, University of Michigan, anthrosource.onlinelibrary.wiley.com/doi/epdf/10.1525/aa.1966.68.6.02a00040.

Further reading 
 
 
 Opie, Iona (1993). The people in the playground. Oxford University Press. . .
 

Folklore
Children's entertainment
Folk culture
Children's street culture